The high courts in Malaysia are the third-highest courts in the hierarchy of courts, after the Federal Court and the Court of Appeal. Article 121 of the Constitution of Malaysia provides that there shall be two high courts of co-ordinate jurisdiction—the High Court in Malaya and the High Court in Sabah and Sarawak (before 1994, the High Court in Borneo). Before 1969, the High Court in Singapore was also part of the Malaysian courts system (see Law of Singapore).

The High Court in Malaya has its principal registry in Kuala Lumpur, with other registries to be found in all states in Peninsular Malaysia, while the High Court in Sabah and Sarawak has its principal registry in Kuching, with other registries elsewhere in Sabah and Sarawak. There are in total 22 high court registries across all 13 states in Malaysia. The two High Courts also travel on circuit to other smaller towns.

The two high courts, the Court of Appeal and the Federal Court are classified as superior courts, while the magistrates' courts and the sessions courts are classified as the subordinate courts. The high courts function both as a court of original jurisdiction as well as an appellate court, and are each headed by a chief judge (before 1994, chief justice). The chief judges of Malaya and Sabah and Sarawak are the third and fourth highest positions in Malaysian judiciary after the Chief Justice of the Federal Court (before 1994, the Lord President of the Federal Court) and the President of the Court of Appeal.

High court registries in Malaysia
All high court registries and the subordinate courts found in Peninsular Malaysia including the courts in the Federal Territories of Kuala Lumpur and Putrajaya are under the jurisdiction of the High Court in Malaya. Similarly, all courts found in East Malaysia are under the jurisdiction of the High Court in Sabah and Sarawak including the courts in the Federal Territory of Labuan.

List of chief justices and chief judges

Malaya

Chief Justice of the Supreme Court of Malayan Union (1946-1948) 
1947–1948: Harold Curwen Willan

Chief Justice of the Federation of Malaya (1957–1963) 
 1957–1963: Tun Sir James Thomson

Lord Presidents of the Federal Court of Malaysia (1963–1994) 

 1963–1966: Tun Sir James Thomson
 1966–1968: Tun Syed Sheh Hassan Barakbah
 1966–1974: Tun Mohamed Azmi Mohamed
 1974–1982: Tun Mohamed Suffian Mohamed Hashim
 1982–1984: Raja Tun Azlan Shah
 1984–1988: Tun Salleh Abas
 1988–1994: Tun Abdul Hamid Omar

Chief Justice of Malaya  (prior to 1994, when the position was downgraded to Chief Judges of Malaya) 
1963-1966: Syed Sheh Barakbah
1966-1968: Mohamed Azmi Mohamed
1968-1973: Ong Hock Thye
1973-1974: Mohamed Suffian Mohamed Hashim
1974-1979: Pajan Sarwan Singh Gill
1979-1982: Raja Azlan Shah
1982-1984: Salleh Abas
1984-1988: Abdul Hamid Omar
1988-1992: Hashim Yeop Sani
1992-1994 Gunn Chit Tuan

Some modern texts will refer to them as Chief Judges.

Chief Judges of Malaya (since 1994) 
 1994: Mohamed Eusoff Chin
1994–1998: Anuar Zainal Abidin
 1998–2001: Wan Adnan Ismail
 2001–2002: Ahmad Fairuz Abdul Halim
 2002–2004: Haidar Mohamed Noor
 2004–2006: Siti Norma Yaakob
 2007–2008: Alauddin Sheriff
 2008–2011: Arifin Zakaria
 2011–2017: Zulkefli Ahmad Makinudin
 2017–2018: Ahmad Maarop
 2018–2019: Zaharah Ibrahim
 2019–present: Azahar Mohamed

Borneo (North Borneo (Sabah) and Sarawak)

Singapore

See also
 Chief Justice of the Straits Settlements
 Federal Court of Malaysia
 Malaysian Court of Appeal
 Judiciary of Malaysia
 Lord President of the Federal Court
 Chief Justice of Malaysia
 President of the Court of Appeal of Malaysia
 Chief Judge of Sabah and Sarawak
 1Malaysia Development Berhad scandal

References

Malaysia
Judiciary of Malaysia
Chief justices of Malaysia